Molly Wright may refer to:
Molly Wright (rugby union) (born 1991), New Zealand rugby player
Molly Wright (actress) (born 1996), English actress